Eun-ju, also spelled Eun-joo or Un-joo, Un-ju, is a Korean feminine given name. The meaning differs based on the hanja used to write each syllable of the name. There are 30 hanja with the reading "eun" and 76 hanja with the reading "ju" on the South Korean government's official list of hanja which may be registered for use in given names. Eun-ju was the sixth-most popular name for baby girls born in South Korea in 1970.

People with this name include:

Sportspeople
Im Eun-ju (runner) (born 1961), South Korean long-distance runner
Im Eun-ju (born 1966), South Korean football referee and sports administrator
Lee Eun-ju (sport shooter) (born 1970), South Korean sport shooter
Ha Eun-ju (born 1986), South Korean swimmer
Jung Eun-ju (born 1988), South Korean short track speed skater
Kim Un-ju (born 1989), North Korean weightlifter
Son Eun-ju (born 1990), South Korean track cyclist
Choe Un-ju (born 1991), North Korean football player
Kim Un-ju (footballer, born 1992), North Korean footballer
Kim Un-ju (footballer, born 1993), North Korean footballer
Kang Un-ju (born 1995), North Korean recurve archer
Lee Eun-ju (gymnast) (born 1999), South Korean gymnast

Entertainers
Lee Eun-ju (1980–2005), South Korean actress
Cho Eun-ju (born 1983), South Korean beauty pageant titleholder
Go Joon-hee (born Kim Eun-joo, 1985), South Korean actress
Jung Hye-sung (born Jung Eun-joo, 1991), South Korean actress
Chyung Eun-ju (born 1993), South Korean beauty pageant titleholder

Other
Michelle Eunjoo Park Steel (born 1955), South Korean-born American politician

Fictional characters
Kim Eun-joo, in 2000 South Korean film Il Mare
Heo Eun-joo, in 2003 South Korean film A Tale of Two Sisters
Kim Eun-joo, in 2012 South Korean television series Missing You

See also
List of Korean given names
People with the name spelled in Revised Romanization as Eon-ju:
Lee Un-ju (born 1972), South Korean politician and lawyer
Lee Eun-ju (basketball) (born 1977), South Korean basketball player

References

Korean feminine given names